Robert L. Lynch (also known as Bob Lynch) is an American arts administrator. A former lobbyist, he formerly served as president and chief executive officer of Americans for the Arts. Lynch is a subject matter expert about arts administration and government engagement in the arts. He has been featured on NPR, KCRW, and the Brian Lehrer Show and in The New York Times, Philanthropy News Digest and Truthout.

Career

Prior to serving as an arts administer, Lynch worked as a freelance journalist, was an English teacher, and played guitar in rock bands.

Early in his arts career, Lynch was director of the University of Massachusetts Amherst's Arts Extension Service from 1976 until 1985. Lynch joined Americans for the Arts in 1985, serving as chief executive officer for two years. He left his position when the organization, then known as the National Assembly of Local Arts Agencies, merged with the American Council for the Arts in 1987 and retired from Americans for the Arts after failing to adequately respond to the demands of the field.

Lynch was a subject matter expert in Craft in America's Democracy episode in October 2020. 
In November 2020, Lynch was named to the Joe Biden transition team, serving as a volunteer supporting transition efforts related to the arts and humanities.

References

External links

Robert L. Lynch's profile from the Americans for the Arts

American arts administrators
American lobbyists
Year of birth missing (living people)
Living people